Typical may refer to:

Typical (album), Peter Hammill
"Typical" (song), song by MuteMath
"Typical", song by Frazier Chorus from Sue, 1987
Typical, story collection by Padgett Powell, 1991

See also
Typical Rick, an American Comedy Central television series